Convoy HX 84 was the 84th of the numbered series of Allied North Atlantic HX convoys of merchant ships from Halifax, Nova Scotia, to Liverpool, England, during the Battle of the Atlantic. Thirty-eight ships escorted by the armed merchant cruiser  departed from Halifax on 28 October 1940, eastbound to Liverpool.

Background
On the morning of 5 November, HX 84 had been passed by the cargo liner , which was also bound for Liverpool, enroute from Port Antonio, during which an offer had been made to Mopans Master, Captain Sapsworth, for Mopan to join HX 84. However, the offer had been declined and Mopan continued eastbound alone.

Mopan
Having been thwarted from using its Arado Ar 196 seaplane the previous day, on 5 November the weather was suitable for Admiral Scheer to utilise its air reconnaissance. When the seaplane returned at 12:05 the observer reported having sighted a convoy steaming eastbound at position . No escort had been observed. This confirmed the earlier B-Dienst radio intercept by Admiral Scheer which had identified the convoy as being HX 84.

Onboard Admiral Scheer a dilemma was presented to Kapitän zur See Theodor Krancke regarding whether he should attack the convoy before nightfall, or wait and make his attack at dawn the following day. Kapitän Krancke made the decision to attack, with Admiral Scheer altering course onto 150 degrees and increasing speed to  allowing Krancke to intercept at approximately 15:30.

At 14:27, an hour before Admiral Scheer was scheduled to intercept the convoy, a single smoke column was observed. Once visual acquisition had been made a flag could be observed flying from the vessel's masthead, however the purpose of this could not be established. Unsure as to the identity of the vessel Krancke decided to maintain his course, as to turn away to the east would significantly reduce his ability to intercept HX 84 before darkness fell. 

The vessel was Mopan, by this time approximately three hours ahead of HX 84. On the bridge of Admiral Scheer, as the range decreased, it was decided that the vessel was an armed merchantman, acting as a screen, and stationed ahead or on the flank of the convoy.
Krancke trained all his armament on to Mopan with Admiral Scheer firing warning shots from her secondary armament of  SK C/28 guns, which exploded close to the freighter's bow. At 15:08, by use of a signal lamp, the Admiral Scheer ordered Mopan to heave to.

Admiral Scheer then proceeded to hoist a flag signal stating "Take to your boats and bring your papers across."
Krancke kept his guns trained on Mopans wireless transmission aerials on her masthead and accompanied this with an order that the ship's wireless was not to be used. This caused some rancour onboard Mopan with her wireless officer, James Macintosh, on more than one occasion pleading with Captain Sapsworth to ignore the request from Admiral Scheer and transmit the internationally recognised signal: R-R-R "(I Am Being Attacked By A Raider)," thereby affording Convoy HX 84 the ability to take some form of evasive action.

However, with the guns of Admiral Scheer trained on the Mopan, and given the realisation that at any time his ship could be destroyed, Sapsworth chose to refuse Macintosh's requests and instead ordered his ship's company to abandon ship, upon when they would transfer to Admiral Scheer in order to be taken prisoner. The order was carried out in a measured and organised manner, something that was not lost on Krancke. Following the evacuation of Mopan, Admiral Scheer proceeded to sink the vessel. However, this proved to be a more difficult task than was initially envisaged.

If he was to make a successful interception of HX 84 before nightfall, Krancke knew that time was beginning to run short. No prize crew was sent to Mopan, instead Admiral Scheer opened fire on the merchantman from a distance of approximately  using a combination of her secondary armament of 15 cm guns and her main armament of  SK C/28 guns. Vexed by the continued stubbornness of Mopan, Krancke ordered an increase in the rate of fire from the Admiral Scheers gunners in addition to which he requested the presence of Captain Sapsworth, who cautioned against the targeting of the aft end of his ship as it was where the ammunition for Mopans  gun was stored. Mopan finally sank at 16:05.

Interception

Jervis Bay
Almost two hours had been lost by Admiral Scheer having devoted time to Mopan and the onset of dusk arrived as the cruiser closed with the convoy, a situation that caused significant annoyance to Krancke.

As HX 84 appeared before Admiral Scheer Captain E.S.F. Fegen of Jervis Bay sailed clear of the convoy and attacked the raider so as to cause as much delay as possible, and to allow the convoy to scatter. Incensed with the earlier delay and the approach from the Jervis Bay, Krancke was determined to sink the British vessel.

Jervis Bay was sunk after 20 minutes of fighting with the loss of 190 of her crew. Nevertheless, their sacrifice allowed the convoy to begin to escape.

Beaverford
The merchant ship , armed with only two guns, engaged Admiral Scheer in a cat-and-mouse gunnery duel that lasted for over four hours before Beaverford was sunk with all hands. This allowed most of the convoy to complete their escape. However, given that the convoy ships were scattering in all directions, it is unlikely that anyone on another ship could have reliably seen all of this. The story is also contradicted by the account Admiral Scheers captain wrote after the war. Krancke paid generous tribute to the courage of Jervis Bay, and of a small burning freighter that fired back just before she sank (this must have been Kenbane Head). He did not mention any battle with Beaverford, which he records only as a ship carrying a deck cargo of timber that Admiral Scheer caught up with as it fled at speed far to the south of the main action. When finally caught, Beaverford proved hard to sink by gunfire, and was therefore torpedoed to save ammunition. There is no mention of any fight or any return fire from Beaverford, and far from being a four or five hour battle, Beaverford was attacked only 50 minutes after Kenbane Head and about an hour before Admiral Scheer caught up with Fresno City. There was no time for any such battle. The sinking of Beaverford was witnessed from Fresno City, also fleeing south. Her captain's log recorded: "The Beaverford, bearing 110 degrees East South East was attacked and set on fire, distant about 10 miles".

Other ships
Maiden, Trewellard, Kenbane Head, and Fresno were sunk and the tanker  damaged, but failing light now allowed the rest of the convoy to escape. San Demetrio was abandoned by her crew, but two days later some of the crew, now in lifeboats, sighted San Demetrio, still afloat and still ablaze. They reboarded her, got the engines running, and brought her in to port. This incident later formed the basis for the script of the film San Demetrio London. Admiral Scheer was only able to sink six of the 38 ships in the convoy.

Aftermath
It is debatable that given the unimportance of intercepting a sole merchantman when viewed against that of attacking a 38 ship convoy with negligible protection, that Admiral Scheer would have taken the opportunity to carry out the action that it did with regard to Mopan. 

The time scale that was taken with the interception and subsequent sinking of Mopan, together with that of the successive action against Jervis Bay and Beaverford, may well have played a significant factor in the inability of Krancke to inflict the type of damage on HX 84 as he would have desired. 

Although he failed to warn HX 84 of the direct threat that stood in the convoy's way, nevertheless by ordering the slow and orderly evacuation of Mopan it could well be viewed that Sapsworth played a direct part in delaying the interception of HX 84 by Admiral Scheer.

Ships in the convoy

Allied merchant ships
A total of 38 merchant vessels joined the convoy, either in Halifax or later in the voyage (convoys formed at Bermuda, coded BHX merged on the ocean with the convoys from Halifax as it was easier to protect one large convoy than two smaller ones).  Five merchant ships were sunk when the unified convoy was attacked, with one more sunk after the convoy dispersed.

Convoy escorts
A series of armed military ships escorted the convoy at various times during its journey, with only one present when the Germans attacked.

References

Bibliography

External links
 The HMS Jervis Bay Association
 "The Ballad of Convoy HX84"
 Thirty Eight Ships

HX084
Naval battles of World War II involving Canada
Naval battles of World War II involving Germany
C